Mikhail Nemirovsky (born September 30, 1974) is a Canadian-German former professional ice hockey player who played for EC Bad Kissingen of the German Bayernliga.

He plays right wing, and is 5'11" / 180 cm tall, and weighs 196 lbs / 89 kg. He was born in Odessa, Ukraine. He is a brother of hockey player David Nemirovsky.

He was drafted in 1991 in the OHL in round 7, #103, by the Sudbury Wolves. Nemirovsky played in the Russian Superleague for HC Spartak Moscow and HC Sibir Novosibirsk, the Deutsche Eishockey Liga for the Hannover Scorpions and the American Hockey League for the Fredericton Canadiens. He also played for the Newmarket Royals, Tallahassee Tiger Sharks, Hampton Roads Admirals, Flint Generals, Fort Wayne Komets, Madison Monsters, Charlotte Checkers, New Orleans Brass, Madison Kodiaks, Adirondack IceHawks, Muskegon Fury, Port Huron Border Cats, El Paso Buzzards and Colorado Gold Kings.

He played for Team Canada in the 1997 Maccabiah Games in Israel, winning a gold medal.

References

External links

1974 births
Adirondack IceHawks players
Bracknell Bees players
Canadian ice hockey right wingers
Charlotte Checkers (1993–2010) players
Chicoutimi Saguenéens (QMJHL) players
China Dragon players
Colorado Gold Kings players
Competitors at the 1997 Maccabiah Games
Dresdner Eislöwen players
El Paso Buzzards players
ETC Crimmitschau players
Flint Generals (CoHL) players
Flint Generals players
Fort Wayne Komets players
Fredericton Canadiens players
German ice hockey players
Hampton Roads Admirals players
Hannover Indians players
Hannover Scorpions players
HC Sibir Novosibirsk players
HC Spartak Moscow players
Heilbronner EC players
Jewish ice hockey players
Living people
Maccabiah Games competitors by sport
Maccabiah Games competitors for Canada
Muskegon Fury players
New Orleans Brass players
Newmarket Royals players
Nottingham Panthers players
Ice hockey people from Moscow
Port Huron Border Cats players
Ratingen EC players
Russian ice hockey right wingers
Tallahassee Tiger Sharks players
German people of Russian descent
Canadian expatriate ice hockey players in England
Canadian expatriate ice hockey players in China
Canadian expatriate ice hockey players in Germany
Canadian expatriate ice hockey players in Russia